The 2018 Rugby League Qualifiers is the format used in European rugby league, to determine promotion and relegation between the top two divisions, and forms the second phase of Super League XXIII and the 2018 Rugby League Championship.

Existing Super League sides; Salford Red Devils, Leeds Rhinos and Hull Kingston Rovers reconfirmed their Super League status but Widnes Vikings were relegated to the Championship after only winning one of their seven games.  They will be replaced in Super League by London Broncos, who defeated Toronto Wolfpack 4-2 in the Million Pound Game, ending the Broncos four year exile from Super League.

Format
The Qualifiers sees the bottom four teams from Super League, join the top 4 teams from the Championship. The points totals are reset to zero, and each team plays seven games each, playing every other team once. The teams finishing 1st, 2nd, and 3rd will gain qualification to the Super League XXIV season. The teams finishing 4th and 5th, will play in the "Million Pound Game", at the home of the 4th place team to determine who will take the final place to gain promotion to Super League XXIV. The loser, along with teams finishing 6th, 7th and 8th, will be relegated to the Championship.

Fixtures and results

Each team plays seven fixtures.  The teams that finished 9th and 10th in Super League and 1st and 2nd in the Championship each play four home fixtures and three away with the other four teams playing three at home and four away.

Qualifiers table

References

2018 in English rugby league
Rugby Football League Championship